The 2020 Arizona State Sun Devils football team represented Arizona State University in the 2020 NCAA Division I FBS football season. The Sun Devils played their home games at Sun Devil Stadium in Tempe Arizona, and competed in the South Division of the Pac-12 Conference. They were led by third-year head coach Herm Edwards.

On August 11, 2020, the Pac-12 Conference canceled all fall sports competitions due to the COVID-19 pandemic. On September 3, the Pac-12 announced a 2020 football season featuring a seven-game conference-only schedule starting on November 7 and ending with the Pac-12 Championship Game on December 18.

Due to several games being canceled, the Sun Devils played only four games during the season, compiling a 2–2 record. The team announced on December 20 that it would not participate in any bowl game. Overall on the season, Arizona State outscored their opponents by a combined total of 161 to 93, largely on the strength of their historic 70–7 blowout win over Arizona in the Territorial Cup. It was the second-largest margin of victory in the history of the rivalry.

Offseason

Position key

Recruiting

2020 NFL draft

ASU players drafted into the NFL

Undrafted NFL free agents

Personnel

Coaching staff

Roster

Arizona State roster as of the first week. (as of November 7, 2020)

Depth chart
Starters and backups for Arizona State

True Freshman
Double Position : *

Schedule

Regular season
Arizona State announced its schedule on January 16, 2020. The Sun Devils had games scheduled against Northern Arizona, UNLV, and BYU, but canceled these games on July 10 due to the Pac-12 Conference's decision to play a conference-only schedule due to the COVID-19 pandemic. On July 31, 2020, the Pac-12 Conference announced revisions to the schedule.

Schedule Source:

Game summaries

USC

UCLA

Arizona

Oregon State

Rankings

Players drafted into the NFL

References

Arizona State
Arizona State Sun Devils football seasons
Arizona State Sun Devils football